The 2014 Major League Lacrosse draft took place on January 10, 2014 in Philadelphia, Pennsylvania.

Draft

Round 1

Round 2

Round 3

Round 4

Round 5

Round 6

Round 7

Round 8

Abbreviation key
A- Attack
D- Defense
FOS- Face-off Specialist
G- Goalie
M- Midfield

See also
Major League Lacrosse draft

References

Major League Lacrosse draft
Major League Lacrosse
Major League Lacrosse draft